This is a list of finalists for the 1996 Archibald Prize for portraiture (listed is Artist – Title).

Davida Allen – Anne Purves in purple
Rick Amor – Portrait of Paul Boston
Judy Cassab – Robert Juniper
 Kordelya Zhansui Chi – 'Wrap time' portrait of John Ruane
 Kordelya Zhansui Chi – Hon Ms Jan Wade MP
 Peter Churcher – Betty at Home (Betty Churcher)
Kevin Connor – Self-portrait in the Louvre food hall
    Graeme Davis – Chris Mann reading murder mysteries with pink curtain
Geoffrey Dyer – Claudio Alcorso
    Joe Furlonger – Dr Harold Schenberg
Francis Giacco – Family self-portrait
    Robert Hannaford – Self-portrait (Winner:  People's Choice)
    Robert Hannaford – Cheryl Hurst
Nicholas Harding – Portrait of Barry O'Keefe
    Paul Jackson – Self and Tui
Kerrie Lester – James Morrison with flugelhorn
 Jocelyn Maughan – Paul Ashton Delprat, artist
Lewis Miller – Portrait of Allan Mitelman
    Paul Newton – John Laws (Winner: Packing Room Prize)
Josonia Palaitis – Ray Martin
Jenny Sages – Paul Cox
Wendy Sharpe – Self-portrait – as Diana of Erskineville (Winner: Archibald Prize 1996) (Image)
Garry Shead – Jacqueline McKenzie
Jiawei Shen – Self-portrait with GE (Chinese) Morrison (Image)
Andrew Sibley – Mary-Lou Jelbart in the park
    Eric John Smith – Robert Walker
    Rosemary Valadon – Deborah Conway – in epic mode
    David Van Nunen – Portrait of the artist with Fauve
Wes Walters – Gary Emery
Guy Warren – Portrait of the artist as a young man
    Margaret Woodward – Self-portrait as Sarah Wisse, transported
Salvatore Zofrea – Dr Franco Belgiorno-Nettis

See also
Previous year: List of Archibald Prize 1995 finalists
Next year: List of Archibald Prize 1997 finalists
List of Archibald Prize winners

External links
Archibald Prize 1996 finalists official website

1996
Archibald Prize 1996
Archibald Prize 1996
Archibald
Arch